Kajiado Central Constituency is an electoral constituency in Kenya. It is one of five constituencies in Kajiado County. The constituency was established for the 1988 elections.

Members of Parliament

Wards

References

External links 
Map of the constituency

Constituencies in Kajiado County
Constituencies in Rift Valley Province
1988 establishments in Kenya
Constituencies established in 1988